Tregeseal East (meaning "Stones of the Dance") is a heavily restored prehistoric stone circle around one mile northeast of the town of St Just in  Cornwall, England, United Kingdom. The nineteen granite stones are also known as The Dancing Stones. It is the one surviving circle of three that once stood aligned along an east–west axis on the hillside to the south of Carn Kenidjack.

Location 
The stone circle is in west Cornwall north of the road from Penzance to St Just in Penwith and is approximately one kilometre east of the hamlet of Tregeseal.

Construction 
Two stones are probably missing, since the circle consisted of 21 stones in earlier times. The stone circle was subjected over the centuries to substantial rebuilding and restoration work, so that today only the stones in the eastern half of the circle may be in their original positions.

The stone circle was part of a larger ritual area, similar to the area around The Merry Maidens, It consisted of a possible three stone circles in a general east–west alignment. The other two stone circles were to the west of the existing stone circle. The proposed westernmost of the three circles was detected on RAF aerial photographs from 1947; if a circle, it is much smaller in diameter than the other two and could possibly depict a hut circle instead. The middle stone circle, which originally had the largest diameter and contained ten stones in 1885, today only a single stone is to be found standing.

History 

Stone circles such as that at Tregeseal, were erected in the late Neolithic or in the early Bronze Age by representatives of a Megalithic culture. The first mention of the stone circle in the modern times is found  in the 1754 work Antiquities, historical and monumental, of the County of Cornwall by William Borlase, who reported 17 upright standing stones.

An early drawing, by William Cotton in 1827, can be found in his book Illustrations of Stone Circles, Cromlehs and other remains of the Aboriginal Britons in the West of Cornwall. At that time some of the standing stones in the other stone circles were still visible. William Copeland Borlase reported 15 stones in his work Naenia Cornubia of 1872, and showed the exact location of the stones.

See also 

Other prehistoric stone circles in the Penwith district
 Boscawen-Un
 The Merry Maidens – also known as Dans Maen
 Boskednan – also known as the Nine Maidens of Boskednan

References

Further reading 
 John Barnatt: Prehistoric Cornwall. The Ceremonial Monuments. Turnstone Press Limited, Wellingborough 1982, .
 Ian McNeil Cooke: Standing Stones of the Land's End. Men-an-Tol Studio, Cornwall 1998, .
 Robin Payne: The Romance of the Stones. Alexander Associates, Fowey 1999, .

External links 

 Tregeseal East stone circle site page on  The Megalithic Portal
 Tregeseal Dancing Stones & Carn Kenidjack site page on The Modern Antiquarian

Stone circles in Cornwall
Penwith
St Just in Penwith